The siege of Bactra was a siege of the Hellenistic period that lasted from 208 to 206 BC. It was a siege of the city of Bactra by the Seleucid Empire after they defeated the Greco-Bactrians at the Battle of the Arius. 

The Seleucids besieged the capital of Bactria until concerning news from the west of his dominions and lack of progress against the city led the Seleucid ruler Antiochus III to negotiate a peace treaty with the Bactrian king Euthydemus and lift the siege. It was agreed that Antiochus would recognize Euthydemus as an ally, and he gave one of his daughters as a wife to  Demetrius, Euthydemus' heir.

Siege and peace
The Greco-Bactrians had recently been defeated at the Battle of the Arius by Antiochus III. After this defeat, Euthydemus retreated to Zariaspa, a district of Bactra. The Greco-Bactrians were able to hold out long enough against Antiochus until his fortunes in the west deteriorated.

After two years' laying siege to Bactra, Antiochus' fortunes to the west of his empire had deteriorated to the point where he decided to withdraw from the siege. Euthydemus then sent his son, Demetrius, as his representative to negotiate a peace treaty. Impressed at Demetrius' behaviour and bearing which was seen as worthy of that of a member of the royalty, Antiochus offered him one of his daughters and agreed to a peace treaty. 

As a part of the peace treaty, Euthydemus gave Antiochus elephants which Antiochus, along with his own, may have used at the Battle of Magnesia.

References 

208 BC
207 BC
206 BC
Greco-Bactrian Kingdom
Bactra
Military history of Afghanistan
200s BC conflicts
Bactra